is a retired long-distance runner from Japan, who won the 1991 edition of the Fukuoka Marathon, clocking 2:10:58 on December 1, 1991. The event also served as the national championship contest.

Achievements

References
 1991 Year Ranking

1965 births
Living people
Place of birth missing (living people)
Japanese male long-distance runners
Japanese male marathon runners
Japan Championships in Athletics winners
20th-century Japanese people